Anthony W. Stewart (April 15, 1970 – November 15, 2020) was an American college basketball coach. His last position was as head coach of the UT Martin Skyhawks. Since Stewart joined the Skyhawk program as the associate head coach under Heath Schroyer in 2014, the team won 94 games, the most in a six-year time period since they became part of Division I. Stewart was responsible of the team's three straight 20-win campaigns from 2014–2017, a first for the UT team.  Also in that span, the Skyhawks won five postseason games and was the only Ohio Valley Conference school to win at least one postseason game in each of the last three seasons. Coach Stewart had gone on to coach over 15 professional players during his coaching career.

Playing career
Stewart was a two-sport athlete at Mount Union, where he played both basketball and baseball.

Coaching career
Stewart began his coaching career at Columbus State Community College, before moving on to assistant coaching stops at Long Beach State, Wyoming, Southern Illinois, and Ohio. In 2014, Stewart joined Heath Schroyer's staff at UT Martin, reunited with Schroyer when he served under him as an assistant at Wyoming. In 2016, Schroyer accepted an assistant coaching position at NC State, and Stewart was elevated to interim head coach.

On November 3, 2016, Stewart was given the job on a permanent basis. In his first season at the helm, the Skyhawks went 22–13, finished in first place in the West division of the OVC, and participated in the 2017 CIT. Following the 2017–18 season, his son Parker Stewart transferred from Pittsburgh to UT Martin.

Death

On November 15, 2020, Stewart died suddenly at age 50. The cause is unknown. Anthony was laid to rest at Greenlawn Cemetery in Akron, OH. He is survived by his wife Cheryl and his children Anthony, Parker, and Skylar.

Head coaching record

References

External links
 UT Martin profile

1970 births
2020 deaths
American men's basketball coaches
American men's basketball players
Basketball coaches from Ohio
Basketball players from Akron, Ohio
Long Beach State Beach men's basketball coaches
Mount Union Purple Raiders baseball players
Mount Union Purple Raiders men's basketball players
Ohio Bobcats men's basketball coaches
Southern Illinois Salukis men's basketball coaches
UT Martin Skyhawks men's basketball coaches
Wyoming Cowboys basketball coaches